Rachida Krim (born February 17, 1955) is a French filmmaker and visual artist of Algerian descent.

Life
Rachida Krim was born in Alès, southern France, to parents from Western Algeria who were "rank and file members" of the National Liberation Front. She studied painting and had several exhibitions after her graduation. She began working in film in 1988 as a scriptwriter and in other capacities. In 1992 she traveled to Algeria to make her first film, El Fatha. Her film Sous les pieds des femmes examined personal memories of the Algerian War.

Awards 

 1997 Winner of CICAE Award at the Namur International Festival of French-Speaking Film for Sous les pieds des femmes
 1998 Winner of Prix SACD at Avignon Film Festival for Sous les pieds des femmes
 2003 Winner of Screenplay Creation Fonds at Amiens International Film Festival, shared with Irène Jouannet for Presque tout sur mon père
 2003 winner of TV/Video Competition Award at Ouagadougou Panafrican Film and Television Festival for Houria for Best Series or Sitcom

Works

Films

El Fatha [The Feast], short film, 1992
Sous les pieds des femmes [Beneath the Feet of the Women], 1997
Imra`a safira / La Femme dévoilée [The Unveiled Woman], 1998

Television

Houria, 5 part TV series about issues of sexuality and AIDS, 2002
Pas si simple [Not That Simple], 2009
Permis d'aimer [License to Love], TV movie, 2005

References

1955 births
Living people
French women film directors
French film directors